Nigel Derek Harman (born 11 August 1973) is an English actor, best known for his role as Dennis Rickman in the BBC soap opera EastEnders. He has worked mostly in theatre. He starred in the final series of Hotel Babylon. In early 2013 he started filming for the fourth series of Downton Abbey, playing visiting valet, Mr Green. From 2013 until the series ended in 2017, he played the role of Bradley Dawson in Sky One's Mount Pleasant. He appeared as Lloyd in Series 4 of Cuckoo.

In the theatre, he has played various musical roles including Sky Masterson in Michael Grandage's revival of Guys and Dolls and Lord Farquaad in the original London production of Shrek the Musical for which he received an Olivier Award for his performance.

Childhood
Harman grew up in Woldingham, and was educated at Dulwich College. However, he found school difficult: "I was never comfortable sitting down. I always wanted to get involved in something, not just learn and write. I was in so much trouble I had my own desk in detention." His father was a bank manager, but also involved in amateur dramatics including work with Croydon Operatic and Dramatic Association (CODA), an interest which was passed on to Harman. His mother was also involved in the productions, but she died when Harman was 18.

Career

Early career
By the age of eight, he already had a manager and in 1984 he made his first major television appearance in the BBC1 drama series Tenko which was followed by appearances in Alas Smith and Jones (1986) and The Honey Siege (1987). He then turned his hand to larger theatre roles, appearing in productions such as Privates on Parade, Much Ado About Nothing and Summer Holiday. He trained at Arts Educational Schools in London and was in the original cast of Mamma Mia!. He also performed in musicals on cruise ships for six and a half months, but told Paul O'Grady that he hated the experience. Having only worked on the stage and in musical theatre since leaving private school, Harman determined to expand into television and pursued TV roles. He had minor parts in episodes of Red Cap, Doctors and Coupling, but had to support himself by taking jobs at Pizza Hut and as a driver for supermarket chain Sainsbury's a fate not uncommon for many actors.

EastEnders
In 2003 he won the high-profile role of Dennis Rickman in the BBC soap opera EastEnders.

His character's first notable bustup was with local hard man Phil Mitchell whom he punched in his very first episode making him the first of his many enemies. A few months later, Dennis was beaten up by some thugs who had been sent around by Phil. Then his long-lost father "Dirty" Den Watts (played by Leslie Grantham) famously returned after being presumed dead for over 14 years and together with Dennis framed Phil for armed robbery causing Phil to flee Walford on the run from police.

Harman left EastEnders on 5 November 2005, and his final episode was aired on 30 December 2005 in which Dennis was stabbed to death in the street by one of Johnny Allen's (Billy Murray) henchman (it was later discovered to be Danny Moon, played by Jake Maskall).

During his time on EastEnders Harman won multiple awards such as the following:

Wins:
National Television Awards 2003 Most Popular Newcomer
British Soap Awards 2004 Sexiest Male and Best Newcomer
Inside Soap Awards 2004 Sexiest Male and Best Actor
British Soap Awards 2005 Sexiest Male
Inside Soap Awards 2005 Sexiest Male and Best Actor
Nominations:
British Soap Awards 2005 Best Actor
National Television Awards 2004 Most Popular Actor
National Television Awards 2005 Most Popular Actor
Inside Soap Awards 2005 Best Couple (Shared with Letitia Dean)

Theatre work
After leaving EastEnders in December 2005, he appeared as Sky Masterson in Guys and Dolls at the Piccadilly Theatre in the West End alongside Jenna Russell and Nigel Lindsay. He opened alongside Sarah Lancashire who left the production with illness on 4 January 2006. He left the show in March 2006. In April 2006, he played Kerry Max Cooke in The Exonerated at Riverside Studio Theatre in Hammersmith, London.

In October 2006, Harman appeared in the Harold Pinter play The Caretaker at the Crucible Theatre in Sheffield, starring alongside David Bradley and Con O'Neill. The production toured from February to April 2007. The tour venues were the Theatre Royal, Brighton, Richmond Theatre and the Tricycle Theatre in Kilburn.

Harman resumed the role of Sky Masterson again, joining the Guys and Dolls tour at the Alexandra Theatre, Birmingham in December 2006, and the Mayflower Theatre, Southampton in May 2007.

From May to July 2008 he appeared in The Common Pursuit at the Menier Chocolate Factory for a limited run.

From January to May 2009 he appeared in the play Three Days of Rain at the Apollo Theatre, London with actors Lyndsey Marshal and James McAvoy.

In November and December 2009 he appeared in Public Property by Sam Peter Jackson at the Trafalgar Studios.

In May and June 2010, Harman appeared in the stage production of True West at the Crucible Theatre, Sheffield.

From May 2011 to February 2012 he played Lord Farquaad in the West End production of Shrek the Musical, at the Theatre Royal, Drury Lane. For his performance, he won the Olivier Award for Best Supporting Performance in a Musical and Theatregoers' Choice Award for Best Supporting Actor in a Musical.

In July 2012 he played Sir Charles Surface in The School for Scandal at the Theatre Royal, Bath.

From September 2012 to January 2013 he starred alongside Rob Brydon and Ashley Jensen in Alan Ayckbourn's A Chorus of Disapproval at the Harold Pinter Theatre in the West End.

In August 2013, it was announced Harman would play the role of Simon Cowell in the West End musical I Can't Sing! The X Factor Musical, which opened in February 2014 at the London Palladium. Despite positive reviews, the musical closed in May.

Also in 2014, Harman was revealed as the director for the UK tour of Shrek The Musical, which opened in July in Leeds and finished in February 2016 in Salford. The tour resumed in Edinburgh in December 2017.

In October 2016 he directed a double-bill Lunch and The Bow of Ulysses by Steven Berkoff at the Trafalgar Studios.

From January to February 2017, Harman starred in the French comedy What's in a Name? at the Birmingham Repertory Theatre alongside Sarah Hadland, Jamie Glover, Olivia Poulet and Raymond Coulthard.

Harman directed the London premiere of the musical Big Fish, starring Kelsey Grammer, which played at The Other Palace in November and December 2017.

From February to April 2019, Harman toured the UK in David Mamet's play Glengarry Glen Ross opposite Mark Benton.

Harman played the lead as Robert Langdon in the stage adaptation tour of Dan Brown's The Da Vinci Code. The tour opened on 10 January 2022 in Bromley.

Film and television work
Harman's success on television and stage has facilitated a move into other television and film roles. In 2006 he played the leading role in one-off drama thriller The Outsiders, co-starring actors Colin Salmon and Brian Cox. Later that year he made a brief appearance in the Hollywood film Blood Diamond.

In 2007 and 2008 he made guest appearances in the Channel 4 series: Comedy Showcase and City of Vice as well as an episode of the BBC drama series Lark Rise to Candleford. He also played his first major film role (as singer Jess Conrad) in Telstar.

In 2009 he appeared in the series Plus One and took over from Max Beesley as the new male lead in the BBC drama Hotel Babylon playing new owner Sam Franklin.  He also appeared as a "Dealer" in the Channel 4 online educational game 'The Curfew'.

In 2011 he appeared in an episode of Agatha Christie's Marple.

In 2013 he appeared in the fourth series of Downton Abbey, playing the role of a visiting valet named Mr Green. From 2013 until the series ended in 2017, he played Bradley Dawson in Mount Pleasant.

On 7 February 2023, the BBC announced that Harman had joined the cast of Casualty as Dr Max Cristie, the new Clinical Lead of the Emergency Department. He is due to make his debut that same month.

Filmography

Films

TV

References

External links
 

1973 births
Laurence Olivier Award winners
Living people
People educated at the Arts Educational Schools
British male musical theatre actors
British male soap opera actors
British male stage actors
People educated at Dulwich College
People from Purley, London
Male actors from London
20th-century British male actors
21st-century British male actors